Mahrajganj may refer to:



Towns/District

Uttar Pradesh
 Maharajganj district, a district in Uttar Pradesh, India
 Mahrajganj, Azamgarh, a town in Azamgarh district in Uttar Pradesh, India
 Mahrajganj, Raebareli, a town in Rae Bareli district in Uttar Pradesh, India
 Mahrajganj, Uttar Pradesh, a town in Maharajganj district in Uttar Pradesh, India

Bihar
 Maharajganj, Siwan, a town in Bihar, India
 Maharajganj Subdivision, a subdivision of Bihar, India
 Maharajganj (community development block), a community block of Bihar, India

Nepal
 Maharajganj, Nepal, a village development committee in Kapilvastu District in the Lumbini Zone of southern Nepal

Electoral constituencies 
 Maharajganj (Bihar Lok Sabha constituency), India
 Maharajganj (Uttar Pradesh Lok Sabha constituency), India
 Maharajganj, Siwan (Vidhan Sabha constituency), Bihar, India